Scopula flaccidaria is a moth of the family Geometridae. It was described by Zeller in 1852. It is found in the Asia Minor, Russia and south-eastern Europe.

References

Moths described in 1852
flaccidaria
Moths of Europe
Moths of Asia